44 Aquarii is a single star located 336 light years away from the Sun in the equatorial constellation of Aquarius. 44 Aquarii is its Flamsteed designation. It is visible to the naked eye as a dim, yellow-hued star with an apparent visual magnitude of 5.75. This body is moving away from the Earth with a heliocentric radial velocity of +7.4 km/s.

A stellar classification of G6 III indicates this is an evolved giant star, most likely (98% chance) on the horizontal branch, having exhausted the hydrogen at its core and expanded. It is a suspected variable star of unknown type. 44 Aquarii is 537 million years old with about 2.53 times the mass of the Sun and 9 times the Sun's radius. The star is radiating 62 times the Sun's luminosity from its photosphere at an effective temperature of 5,025 K. At this heat, the star has the golden-hued glow of a G-type star.

References

External links
 Image 44 Aquarii

G-type giants
Horizontal-branch stars
Suspected variables
Aquarius (constellation)
Durchmusterung objects
Aquarii, 044
211434
110023
8504